This article catalogues public art on the Toronto subway. It lists public art installed at Toronto subway stations by subway line and station. More information may be found in the individual station articles.

See also

Toronto Subway (typeface)

References

External links
 
 Art on the TTC published by Transit Toronto

Toronto Transit Commission stations
Lists of public art in Canada